William Percival Grieve, QC (25 March 1915 – 22 August 1998) was a British Conservative Party politician.

Grieve was educated at Trinity Hall, Cambridge. He became a barrister, and was called to the bar at Middle Temple in 1938, and a Queen's Counsel in 1962. He was assistant recorder of Leicester 1956-65 and became recorder of Northampton in 1965 and Deputy Chairman of Lincoln (Holland) Quarter Sessions in 1962.

Grieve contested the 1962 Lincoln by-election, where he lost heavily to Labour's Dick Taverne. At the 1964 general election, he was returned as Member of Parliament (MP) for Solihull, and re-elected until his retirement from Parliament at the 1983 general election. He briefly employed the slogan "Grieve for Solihull".

He married, in 1949, Evelyn Raymonde Louise (d. 1991), daughter of Commandant Hubert Mijouain, of Paris, and maternal granddaughter of Sir George Roberts, 1st and last baronet. Their son Dominic Grieve, QC, PC, was elected MP for Beaconsfield at the 1997 general election, and became Attorney General for England and Wales in May 2010.

References

Times Guide to the House of Commons, 1966 and 1979

External links
 
 Obituary by Patrick Cosgrave

1915 births
1998 deaths
British King's Counsel
Alumni of Trinity Hall, Cambridge
English barristers
Members of the Middle Temple
Conservative Party (UK) MPs for English constituencies
UK MPs 1964–1966
UK MPs 1966–1970
UK MPs 1970–1974
UK MPs 1974
UK MPs 1974–1979
UK MPs 1979–1983
20th-century English lawyers